Chinochthamalus is a genus of star barnacles in the family Chthamalidae. There is one described species in Chinochthamalus, C. scutelliformis.

References

Barnacles